Danny Philip Ross (born 4 November 1983) is an Australian singer, songwriter and guitarist based in City of Darebin, Victoria.

Ross is best known as a 2013 finalist on The Voice Australia, and is a regular performer at musical festivals and live venues in Australia. Ross has described the death of his father, who was a farmer but loved singing-songwriting, as the inspiration for him focusing on a career in music, Ross was coached by Joel Madden of Good Charlotte fame. He is an accomplished guitarist and demonstrated guitars for Jacksons Rare Guitars.

Ross' debut album As the Crow Flies was released 12 July 2013. The album debuted and peaked at number 61 on the ARIA charts.

Discography

Albums

Charting singles

References

External links
 Danny Ross Facebook

Living people
Australian blues guitarists
Australian male guitarists
Australian folk singers
Australian folk musicians
1984 births
21st-century Australian singers
21st-century guitarists
21st-century Australian male singers